The 2010s were defined by hipster fashion, athleisure, a revival of austerity-era period pieces and alternative fashions, swag-inspired outfits, 1980s-style neon streetwear, and unisex 1990s-style elements influenced by grunge and skater fashions. The later years of the decade witnessed the growing importance in the western world of social media influencers paid to promote fast fashion brands on Pinterest and Instagram.

Popular global fashion brands of the decade included Abercrombie and Fitch, Adidas, Balenciaga, Ben Sherman, Burberry, Christian Dior, Coach, DSquared2, Dorothy Perkins, Fashion Nova, Forever 21, Gucci, H&M, Hollister, Hugo Boss, Lacoste, Louis Vuitton, Marks and Spencer, Michael Kors, Monsoon Accessorize, Nike, Nine West, Off-White, River Island, Supreme, Topman, Topshop, Uniqlo, Under Armour, and Vans.

Designers and models
The leading European and American designers of the early 2010s included Nicolas Ghesquière, Miuccia Prada, Frida Giannini, Marc Jacobs, Phoebe Philo, and Karl Lagerfeld. Notable Asian fashion designers include Louie Mamengo and Michael Cinco.

Top female international models include Gisele Bündchen, Lara Stone, Raquel Zimmermann, Karlie Kloss, Kaia Gerber, Adut Akech, Adriana Lima, Joan Smalls, Natasha Poly, Liu Wen, Anja Rubik, Freja Beha Erichsen, Mariacarla Boscono, Suki Waterhouse, Lindsey Wixson, Arizona Muse, Saskia de Brauw, Behati Prinsloo, Lily Aldridge, Lais Ribeiro, Irina Shayk, Elsa Hosk, Martha Hunt, Constance Jablonski, Catherine McNeil, Monika Jagaciak, Emily DiDonato, Jessica Hart, Rosie Huntington-Whiteley, Gigi Hadid, Kendall Jenner, Karmen Pedaru, Mica Argañaraz, Candice Swanepoel, Cara Delevingne, Vanessa Axente, Cameron Russell, Amanda Murphy, Julia Nobis, Edie Campbell, Lexi Boling, Imaan Hammam, Binx Walton, Edita Vilkeviciute, Andreea Diaconu, Aymeline Valade, Fei Fei Sun, Iselin Steiro, Anais Mali, Anne Vyalitsyna, Jourdan Dunn, Toni Garrn, Jamie Bochert, Daphne Groeneveld, Rianne van Rompaey, and Anna Ewers.

Top male international models include Sean O'Pry, David Gandy, Clément Chabernaud, Baptiste Giabiconi, Garrett Neff, Arthur Kulkov, Noah Mills, Will Chalker, Evandro Soldati, Adam Senn, Francisco Lachowski, Andrés Velencoso, Simon Nessman, Mathias Lauridsen, Marlon Teixeira, and younger men like Lucky Blue Smith or Brooklyn Beckham.

Women's clothing

Early 2010s (2010–2012)

1980s Influences

The early 2010s saw many recycled fashions from the 1950s, 1970s, and 1980s as designers from stores like Topshop replicated original vintage clothing. In the United States, it was popular to wear Gucci, Chanel, or Versace designer clothing, and neon colors such as pink, green, teal, black, purple, magenta, and yellow.

Popular tops for American, British, and Australian women aged 20–50 included tunics, 1980s style baseball jackets, oversized cardigans, western shirts, 2fer and layered shirts and tees, dresses and shirts worn with belts, Abercrombie and Fitch hoodies until 2012, Perfecto motorcycle jackets customized with studs, floral camisoles worn with matching boyshorts, and sundresses. European women wore sparkly dresses, baggy one-size-fits-all Empire line skirts, blouses and dresses, and lace, figure-hugging white organza maxi dresses inspired by Pippa Middleton.

From 2010 to 2012 many late 2000s fashion trends remained popular in Europe, the United States, East Asia, Israel, and South America, especially acid wash skinny jeans, geometric or galaxy printed crew neck sweatshirts and leggings, "trouser-dresses", romper suits, preppy pastel colored skinny jeans, metallic dresses, and capri pants cropped at the ankle. Possibly due to the poor economy in the early years, the midi skirt and the maxi skirt were the most common skirt and dress styles, with the hemline standards being the longest they had been since The Great Depression.

Tribal fashions and 1990s revival
From late 2011 onward, 1990s inspired fashion began to make a comeback in the UK, US, Philippines, India, and Australasia among teen girls and young women aged 15–30. Popular upper apparel included Christmas sweaters, T-shirts with blazers, plaid, oversized flannel shirts worn or tied around the waist, oversized T-shirts, padded gilets, Penshoppe skater skirts (in the Philippines), skorts, crew neck sweaters, T-shirts bearing the word Nerd or Geek, destroyed acid wash Balmain jeans, and crop tops. In the UK and the US, popular bottom apparel includes skinny jeans, leggings, parachute pants, railroad stripe pants or skirts, boyfriend jeans. High-waisted bottoms, such as pants, shorts, skirts, and bathing suits also became the standard for women's fashion in the 2010s, as opposed to the low rise trend that was popular throughout the 2000s.

Desirable footwear from 2012 to 2015 included flat sandals, black, white or multicolored Vans, Keds as worn in ads by Mischa Barton, Ariana Grande and Taylor Swift, TOMS Shoes, Chucks, Sperry top-siders boat shoes, flat knee high riding boots, Uggs, moccasins, Hunter boots brand rain boots, one strap sandals, furry slip-on Puma sandals, Ballerina flats, cavalier boots, gladiator sandals, wedge heel-style sneakers, flip-flops, combat boots, Doc Martens, and The Timberland Company hiking boots.

Other popular trends of the early and mid 2010s included Aztec and Navajo inspired patterns featuring diamonds and triangles, especially on T-shirts, socks, handbags, panties, pullovers, and other knitwear. In addition, young American women began wearing feather earrings, beaded bracelets, sneakers resembling moccasins, ponchos, vests and jackets made from striped Mexican blanket material, despite the connotations of cultural appropriation. These tribal inspired garments, made popular by Urban Outfitters and Ralph Lauren, typically came in bright colors like red, yellow, turquoise, blue, and orange.

Eastern fashions and carry-over styles
Many fashion trends from the early years of the decade, especially the 1980s influences and the 1960s inspired indie, neo-hippie and boho chic looks, remained relevant in the US and Europe as far as 2017. This included skinny jeans, tunics, floral print dresses, midi and maxi skirts, motorcycle jackets, western shirts, red and blue geometric print blouses, patterned and solid colored tights, overalls, jogger pants, flat boots, stiletto shoes, Nike Tempo shorts, pastel and neon colored shorts, ballet flats, and combat boots. Popular colors from 2015 to 2016 included mauve, cream, eggplant, lime green, and warm grey. In the UK, modestwear combined with elements of hip-hop fashion became popular among many young Muslim women, with long skirts decorated with lace and beaded embroidery, colourful floral hijabs, halal cosmetics free from animal products, knee length grey cardigan sweaters worn over leggings, white trenchcoats worn with baggy pants, keffiyehs worn as headscarves, black satin gowns worn with a long shawl collar overcoat, purple kaftan dresses worn with high heeled shoes, and abayas with retro 1980s inspired zigzag patterns.

Continuing on from the late 2000s, Fashion in India moved away from traditional clothes like the saree and glamorous Bollywood style dresses in favor of a more Westernized style that incorporated navy pants, blazers, leather jackets, waistcoats and androgynous military jackets. Popular casual footwear included leather dress boots, stiletto heels, platform sandals, and open toe pumps. Cream, grey, blue and orange Kurta dresses with side slits decorated with pink or purple embroidery and synthetic jewels were worn with jeans or leggings, T shirts, tank tops and bat wing sleeve blouses were paired with traditional silk salwar pajamas or short shorts, and the large hoop earrings declined in popularity in favor of smaller minimalist gold jewelry.

Mid 2010s (2013–2016)

Monochromatic and printed clothing

By the mid-2010s, neon colors were out of style in Europe, America, and Australia. More subdued colors became popular such as burgundy, mustard yellow, olive green, mauve, and blush pink. Bright colors were also replaced by black, white, various shades of gray, and charcoal first on the catwalk, and later as street fashion. Black and white Polka dot dresses underwent a revival in China and North Korea. This trend had spread to Middle Eastern countries like Turkey, Iran and the United Arab Emirates by 2016, with Italian brand Dolce and Gabbana launching a range of black and white hijabs and abayas decorated with lace daisies, roses and lemons.

Monochromatic clothing trends from 2013 to 2017 included black and white lace dresses, lace blouses, jackets and dresses with peter pan collars, white Adidas Superstar sneakers with black or gold stripes, houndstooth or geometric patterned blazers, black or nude slip dresses, T-shirt dresses, white babydoll dresses, bodycon midi dresses, black and white striped "Beetlejuice" style slim-fit pants, long black velvet blazers decorated with silver braid, tuxedo jackets (often having contrasting black velvet or satin lapels), crop tops, oversized coats, striped culottes, loose Capri pants and palazzo pants, patent leather gladiator sandals, romper suits, sheer black tops worn over bralettes, puffer jackets and vests, knee-length skirts, pencil skirts, black and white geometric printed leggings, and cuffed boyfriend jeans. Denim declined in popularity in the US, with black or grey yoga pants, leggings, and slim-fit jogger pants replacing them. From 2013, small bucket backpacks in colorful prints such as aztec, polka dot, and floral were popular, mirroring the small backpack trend in the 1990s, but by 2015, these small backpacks were largely replaced by Herschel zip-up backpacks with brown diamond patches on the front.

Costume jewelry and onesies
Loom bands, bracelets woven from brightly colored rubber bands, were seen as both a global fashion statement and a children's fad. In France, Ireland and America, 1990s-inspired Choker necklaces featuring colored glass beads, silver chain link, artificial diamonds, Swarovski crystals, lace, velvet, and black or red leather had returned to popularity. By 2016, Chokers were also worn as an attachment to dresses and shirts, as a high-neck style and with shoulders exposed also known as "cold shoulder". Small and dainty jewelry replaced the large amounts of bracelets and statement necklaces that were popular at the beginning of the decade.

Another brief fad of the mid-2010s included the unisex onesie suit (like One-piece). Originally envisioned as pajamas, onesies were often purchased as a gag gift, and worn as casual streetwear by some younger women in the UK, Australia, and the US, including Amy Childs, Kourtney Kardashian, and Holly Carpenter.

Hippie and grunge influences
The early to mid 2010s witnessed a revival of grunge fashion in America with more of an "edgy" interest of denim ripped jeans and ripped jackets, flannels, animal print coats, printed t-shirts which were frequently color or stone faded, black combat boots, biker boots, and leather motorbike jackets.

Beginning in 2013, there was a revival of late 1960s and early 70s bohemian fashions in the US, UK, India, and France, notably of bell bottom style pants, Birkenstocks, gypsy blouses, palazzo pants, dresses with cutouts, lace-up tops, crocheted crop tops, sweaters and halternecks, and Bardot off the shoulder tops. The lace up trend was also highly popular with footwear, largely because of Tunisian shoe designer Azzedine Alaia. In America, women favored white, black, camel, warm grey, or blush sweater dresses, thin turtlenecks popularized by The Kardashians, catsuits, jumpsuits, playsuits or rompers, high necked Victorian inspired lace dresses, and leather, tan, or olive green duster coats. Solid wedge heels, Stuart Weitzman knee boots, platform shoes and perspex heels, also known as the "nothing shoe" became a popular trend in 2016.

Late 2010s (2017–2019)

1970s revival
From 2017 to 2021, the brightly colored beige, red, green, brown and orange 1970s revival fashions began to replace the grey and monochromatic 1990s inspired streetwear in Britain, India, North America and France. Particularly popular were the sheepskin coats, moon boots, flared double breasted trouser suits in black, purple, pink, cream, grey, and navy blue tartan, baggy floral maxi dresses, blue gingham dresses, applique cropped wide leg jeans, denim jackets with embroidered red roses, multicolored tie dye skirts, baby blue and China print dresses worn with black tights, pale denim shirt dresses worn unbuttoned over blouses and light wash jeans, white sneakers, leopardskin coats, Marks and Spencer gold dresses with bows, distressed jeans, peacoats, brown granny boots, neon green, tangerine, or pale dusky pink midi-dresses, white peplum dresses reminiscent of those worn by Princess Leia, leather jackets in red, purple, green, blue, tan or black, slightly flared jeans, white and blue floral print shirt dresses, loosely woven plaid blouses, pleats, ruffles, stripes, mismatched earrings popularised by Kate Moss, mandarin collar tops, purple dresses with puffball sleeves, leather or PVC miniskirts, translucent yellow or orange cold shoulder blouses, oversized paisley, suede or black vinyl handbags, embroidered long sleeve T-shirts, throws, Cowichan sweaters, fringed shift dresses, wraps, gold brocade blazers, ponchos, fur lined parkas, silver sequined cocktail dresses, denim skirts, geometric print blouses, floral Brigitte Bardot minidresses and blouses with flouncy sleeves, kimono jackets made from the same brightly colored silk as aloha shirts, leather safari blazers, jumper dresses, slim fitting capri pants, babydoll dresses, knee boots, flat ankle boots with tights, or crew or knee socks slouched down over tights, leggings, jeggings, or skinny jeans. Also seen are snakeskin or sequinned pants, cold shoulder tops, peasant blouses, oversized hoop earrings, velvet blazers and dresses in pink, cobalt blue, red, navy, gold, and forest green, fur vests, Jeremy Corbyn caps, camel wool coats, hot pants, tunics, army green parkas, rainbow striped sweaters, sunflower print maxi dresses, PVC jackets, black velvet Nehru jackets with gold braid, ghillies, Grecian sandals, red, white, salmon, lavender or orange crocheted jumpers, and Swedish Fjällräven Kånken rucksacks in colors such as mustard, navy, forest green, and dusty pink. Although shirt collars remained relatively small, by 2019 these began to be replaced in the UK by overized Revere collars reminiscent of disco fashion. The pantywaist tops previously fashionable as sportswear in the late 1970s and early 1980s, started to commonly replace T-shirts in the UK, US and South Africa, especially among pop stars and models like Candice Swanepoel, Emily Ratajkowski, Nicki Minaj, and Beyoncé, whose one-off bodysuits were modified from vintage Adidas and Chicago Bulls jerseys. By way of Alessandro Michele of Gucci's creative direction, flat mule shoes, clear shoes, sandals and orange, brown or pink mule heels reminiscent of those worn by Barbie dolls started making a resurgence in Italy and Americas from early 2017 onwards, sometimes featuring tiger embroidery, florals, beadwork, or furry lining.

Another emerging trend of 2018–19, popularized by Calvin Klein, Coach, Alexander McQueen and Tommy Hilfiger, took inspiration from 1970s blue collar Americana, especially the clothing worn by biker chicks, cowgirls, hard rock fans, and small town inhabitants of the "American heartland". Faded red, pale blue, black, and off white were particularly desirable colors. Common items in Britain and America included pale denim jeans, "mom" jeans, stacked waist denim, skirts and jackets, black or white clutch bags, Western shirts, jackets dresses, and even sneakers with Old West inspired floral embroidery, capri pants, suede fringed bags, Khloe Kardashian's Good American brand jeans, black or dark blue denim miniskirts, dungarees, shortalls, oversized silver belt buckles, 90s inspired scrunchies worn in the hair and as a wristband, biker jackets in black, grey or brown, bandanas, red or blue gingham skirts and primark dresses, black dresses and sweaters with stars and stripes motifs, black or white T-shirts, sandals decorated with black, white and orange beads, low cowboy boots, white shoes, black leather jackets, and shirts featuring graffiti, throwback sports logos, rose motifs, vintage advertising brands, 1950s cartoon characters, and old school tattoo designs like tigers, eagles, hearts, skulls, revolvers and snakes which were typically more subdued than the garish Ed Hardy designs of the early 2010s.

Mature look
By 2017, it had also become fashionable for younger middle-class women in Britain, Ireland, Norway, Sweden, Australia, New Zealand, Canada, Denmark, and Finland to wear more "grown up" or normcore styles, in reaction to the previous mismatched hipster fashions and the athleisure trend of 2014 which mixed traditional formal wear with high end sportswear. Longer plaid skirts, billowing white blouses, vintage sheer black stockings with garterbelts, bias cut midi skirts, pale blue belted trenchcoats, Argyle sweaters, silk blouses, sensible flat shoes and sandals, straight leg jeans, long powder blue coats worn with matching pillbox hats, traditional style wool or silk scarves, blue or red paisley Nehru collar coats of the type popularised by Zara, nude pantyhose, bows similar to those worn by Margaret Thatcher, black velvet, blush and blue denim mule slippers with bows, and baggy black capri pants became popular in the UK in response to perceived sexualised and misogynistic dress codes in many workplaces (especially the compulsory wearing of high heels), and also due to the influence of Kate Middleton and celebrity early adopters like Victoria Beckham who sought a more professional looking image in the winter of 2016. Skinny jeans began to be replaced by straight leg jeans designed to follow the contours of the body, and other accessories that declined in popularity included chokers, gaudy brand labels, ripped jeans, patches, and pin badges due to their childish connotations.

Men's clothing

Early 2010s (2010–2012)

Neon colors
Neon colors and elaborate T-shirts were popular for much of the early 2010s, especially graphic print hoodies, novelty socks, red or blue skinny jeans, studded belts with large buckles, and Ed Hardy T-shirts embellished with rhinestones.

Many styles from the late 2000s remained fashionable in Europe, Australasia, and the Americas, with brands such as Polo Ralph Lauren and J Crew being well favored. Popular tops for men aged 20–50 included shawl collar cardigans, V-neck T-shirts, acid wash denim work shirts, cable knit pullovers, Tartan flannel Western shirts with snap fastenings, grunge style padded tartan overshirts in red, navy blue or dark green, throwback basketball or baseball uniforms, denim jackets, Aloha shirts, car coats, 1930s style linen sportcoats, brown or black brogues, and black leather jackets like the Schott Perfecto motorcycle jacket.

1990s revival
In the summer of 2011, 1980s and 1990s inspired fashion made a comeback in the UK among men. This included bright colored short shorts, jeans shorts with a stone wash or acid wash, shorter 7, 6, and 5 inch inseam shorts from mid 2010s on, shirts with Aztec patterns, Mayan patterns, camouflage prints or 19animal prints, flannel shirts, high top sneakers, snapback hats, and gaudy wristwatches.

In the Americas, the trend caught on in both Summer 2011 and Spring 2013. The Grunge look had made a comeback due to the influence of Steves Peeps, an artist from Boston. upper items of clothing include bomber jackets, black leather jackets, crombie overcoats, padded tartan overshirts, crewneck sweatshirts, oversized flannel shirts, throwback basketball or baseball uniforms, and preppy Nantucket Reds. Other popular accessories of the early to mid 2010s included Doc Martens, The Timberland Company, combat boots, Converse All Stars, Sperry Top-Siders, Ugg boots, Nike Elite crew socks, snapback hats,brown Oxford shoes, and classic Nike trainers. Maroon baseball jackets and ringer Tees featuring a specific sports team's logo were particularly popular in the Philippines due to the widespread media coverage of the UAAP Games athletes.

Business casual
The business casual look of the 1990s and early 2000s remained common in many parts of the Americas, with jeans, loafers, boat shoes and sneakers being seen as acceptable to wear in the workplace. The decline in the formality of men's fashion that started in the 1960s continued until 2012, with men wearing informal clothing on a regular basis, even at work or while travelling, as an apparent extension of Beau Brummell's older idea that gentlemen shouldn't try to outshine the ladies for attention. This contrasted to Britain, Italy, Europe, and parts of the US, where more formal Mad Men-inspired business clothing such as slim-fitting grey two piece suits had made a comeback in the workplace during the early 2010s. At this time, tweed cloth sportcoats became acceptable town wear, and business suits imitated the broad shouldered, form fitting styles of the 1920s, sometimes with contrasting lapel piping.

Mid 2010s (2013–2016)

Workwear and luxury sportswear
From 2013 to 2015, men's fashion was heavily influenced by the improving economy and fashion-conscious cities such as London, New York City, Paris, and Milan, and incorporated elements of hip-hop fashion, luxury fashion, sportswear, athleisure and skater apparel. Bright colors, studded belts and retro styled graphic prints (especially 1960s–80s advertising logos, classic rock bands, and the loud Ed Hardy shirts) went out of style in favor of plain black, white, beige, taupe, gray, marl, burgundy, and various shades of dark green. Common clothing items in the Americas, Britain and Russia included tailored marl sweatpants, jersey shirts, chunky hiking boots with thick soles, bomber jackets, hoodies with Cyrillic lettering, shirts with constructivist motifs, fake fur, tracksuits, leather jackets, denim jackets, DHL T-shirts, thick oversized anoraks, unstructured blazers, double-breasted sportcoats, shorts riding above the knee (toward a 5" inseam, down from 15"), drop crotch pants, slim fitting jogger pants, and deep red, gold, white, black and silver high tops. Sales in floral print clothing designs for men more than doubled amongst fashion retailers between 2013 and 2014.

From 2013 to 2016, workwear became a significant trend in Britain, Ireland and the Americas. Besides the cardigan sweaters, knit caps, flat caps, dark denim jackets, waxed jackets, yellow fishermens macs, and flannel shirts previously popularised by indie kids, Grenson brogues, oxblood Red Wing work boots and the grandfather collar shirt emerged as a semi-casual fashion item in western cultures. In China and Europe, retro feiyue martial arts sneakers in red, white and blue made a comeback.

Common accessories include Ray-Ban wayfarer sunglasses, paisley scarfs, teashade glasses, tortoise shell glasses, snake skin or plaited leather belts, flat caps, newsboy caps, bum bags, trilbys, and pork pie hats.

Formal business wear
In the UK, Italy, Australia and US, many professional men wear grey mohair or houndstooth office suits, usually with two-button fastening, a single vent, and narrow lapels inspired by the American TV show Mad Men, Hannibal, and Daniel Craig as James Bond. Businessmen in Asian countries like the Philippines generally followed the trend, but dispensed with the necktie in favor of a semi-formal, simple shirt better suited to the hot tropical climate. As part of the general 1980s revival, the waistcoat made a comeback as part of the three piece suit in Europe and the US. In the early 2010s these suits were mostly charcoal grey, shiny steel grey and silver (especially in Australia and America), but by 2014 these were joined by air force blue, navy blue, midnight blue, and sky blue.

In the UK, US and Germany, the suits of the mid-2010s often featured checks, houndstooth, Glen plaid, bird's eye, Prince of Wales plaid cloth, or windowpane tweed, and the stripes on pinstripe suits became narrower and more closely spaced. Popular footwear of spring 2016 included round toed Oxford shoes, loafers, and Chelsea boots. Thin ties remained the norm, but the simple notch lapels of 2010 were increasingly replaced by shawl collars and peak lapels on single breasted three piece suits. By 2016, the black and silver digital wristwatches of the early 2010s had gone out of style among professional men in favor of classic oversized analog wristwatches with round black, gold or white faces and traditional brown, tan or black leather straps.

Continuing on from the 2000s, fur ushanka and Astrakhan caps were often worn at wintertime formal occasions in Russia, Georgia, Kashmir, and Pakistan as both a symbol of national pride, and as a means of rejecting the excesses of Westernising globalization. In Afghanistan and Uzbekistan, however, the wearing of traditional dress such as the Astrakhan cap, kurta and pajama began to decline among professionals in favor of a Western style suit and tie, as part of a wider backlash against Hamid Karzai's regime.

African fashion
The mid-2010s witnessed the beginnings of Africa's own haute couture due to increased restriction on secondhand mitumba clothing in Kenya and Uganda. Mozambican designer Taibo Bacar was the first African fashion brand to debut at Milan Fashion Week in 2010 and became one of Africa's leading fashion houses, proving that African fashion can compete on the world stage.

Contemporary clothing in Africa is often cut to unisex Western patterns but uses indigenous fabric associated with folk costume, such as a sportcoat made from striped kikoy fabric, a shirt made from kente cloth, or the silk Madiba shirts popularised in South Africa by Nelson Mandela. At the same time, some aspects of traditional attire such as wooden jewelry or the Dashiki were worn by expatriate Africans in the West, African Americans, and some liberal white Americans.

In South Africa and the Congo, Dandies known as sapeurs and swenkas began imitating the wardrobes of the previous colonialist regime, by importing expensive modern three piece designer suits and customising them with vintage accessories such as the fedora, spats, bowtie and cane.

Late 2010s (2017–2019)

Relaxed look
By November 2018, fashion designers in the US and other countries began to move away from the slim fitting casual attire and frequently combined business casual pieces with sportswear. Brown replaced black as the most popular color for leather jackets, and common accessories included orange hoodies, black track pants, faded jeans covered in iron-on patches, black or white leather hi-tops, Timberland boots, navy blue wool coach jackets, graphic print tees featuring a small statement design, dark flannel sportcoats, cambric shackets, or camouflage jackets layered over cardigans or Alpine patterned sweaters, and white Adidas sneakers. From 2018 to 2020, baggy cargo pants with external pockets were reintroduced, skate shoes declined in popularity, and long tweed coats became popular.

In the American workplace, brown suits made a comeback, unstructured suits became popular in Britain as an alternative to the restrictive, slim fitting styles of the late 2000s. Wide neckties (frequently in patterned paisley silk, red and blue stripes, or knitted wool in black, tan or grey) replaced the thin styles of the mid-2000s, and polo shirts or turtlenecks became an acceptable substitute for dress shirts.

1970s and Britpop influences
Beginning in March 2017, clothing inspired by 1990s Britpop, mod revival and 1970s fashion became popular among young men in the US, UK, Australia, Canada, Ireland, Italy, Hong Kong, and France, especially in beige, cream, sand, orange, blue, brown, dark green, ecru, red, pistachio, and complementary neutral tones. Desirable items included suede cowboy boots and winklepickers, stone grey suits with Teddy Boy inspired velvet shawl collars, retro black and red sneakers, Chelsea boots with contrasting red and blue elastic, striped dress shirts, sailor T shirts with vertical navy blue stripes, tropical print shirts, navy and red track jackets, two button cream trenchcoats, corduroy sportcoats worn with turtle neck sweaters, double breasted navy blue or herringbone tweed overcoats with shawl collars, six button polo shirts, natural suede chukka boots, sunflower print button-down shirts, white T-shirts with orange and blue color blocks, turquoise dip dye swimshorts, military chic parkas, wool overcoats, red Superdry parkas with fur hoods, navy blue straw trilby hats, short sleeved cardigans, red Doc Martens, houndstooth or Prince of Wales check sportcoats, pants with a contrasting red stripe, lightweight nautical inspired navy peacoats, embroidered silk souvenir jackets featuring birds, skulls, dragons or tigers, bomber jackets with orange linings, Converse modern sneakers in silver, red, royal blue, or green, muted Aloha shirts worn over plain T-shirts, brown flying jackets, corduroy pants, beige anoraks, pale denim slim-fit jeans and chinos, checked button down shirts in pink, blue, orange, red, and white with oversized Cuban collars, cropped black high waisted pants, Henley shirts, grey T-shirts, preppy striped polo shirts with wider collars, double strap combat boots, claret, teal, electric blue, or navy blue velvet tuxedo jackets, and psychedelic floral print shirts frequently worn tucked into the pants.

Children's clothing

New influences
The decade saw the rise of child influencers with parents posting pictures of young children using sponsored products such as clothing online. The birth of a new generation of the British royal family from 2013 also impacted children's fashion, with sales of garments often sharply increasing if the royal children had been pictured wearing them. Other high-profile children were also known to have an effect on the fashion industry.

Youth fashion

Hipsters, Twee and steampunks
By the early 2010s, British, American, and Filipino indie clothing had moved away from the bright colors and overt 1960s styling of the mid-2000s in favor of a more "grown up" intellectual look, with 1990s style earth-tones like grey, burgundy, brown, teal, and beige. Tweed jackets, skinny chino trousers, dress boots, 2fer and layered shirts and tees, cardigan sweaters, nerdy horn-rimmed glasses, sweaters, thick wool socks, worker boots, leggings, and beanies replaced the winklepickers, velvet jackets, Aviator sunglasses, and skinny ties typically worn by indie rock bands, although vintage Western shirts, leather jackets, military dress uniforms, homemade jewelry, and thrift store chic plaid shirts remained popular in Europe. Drop crotch pants, designed by the Danish brand Humör, became more and more popular in Europe amongst hipsters and hip hop fans, who replaced their skinny jeans and carpenter jeans with "old school but modern" style.

American Apparel made normcore a prominent aspect of hipster culture in the US from 2016 onwards. The look is based on modern business casual wear, everyday casual attire worn by older men, and the geek chic clothing worn by stereotypical nerds during the 1980s. Popular accessories include horn rimmed glasses, high waisted pants especially pleated khaki chinos, dad hats, zip up polar fleeces, white or blue button down shirts, socks with sandals, turtlenecks, white tennis shoes, pocket protectors, leather shoes, plain sweaters in muted colors, and, for women, "mom jeans". The fanny pack accessory made a late comeback in 2018 with new packs introduced by fashion designers Gucci, Prada, and Louis Vuitton. Reasons for the "belt bag" being in vogue was attributed to changing lifestyle needs that made categories like luggage, backpacks and even fanny packs popular items on shopping and wish-lists during the 2018 holiday season, along with a persisting taste for throwback fashion, particularly 1980s nostalgia.

In the Americas, Australia and Japan, steampunk gained regional popularity among some young people aged 18–25. From 2011 to 2015, members of this subculture often combined Neo-Victorian and Elegant Gothic aristocrat clothing such as top hats, pocket watches, or (for girls) corsets, velvet or brocade dresses, brooches, and black, dark red or brown leather waistcoats, with bowties, hipster inspired beards and tweed clothing, jewelry made from brass gears, dark skinny jeans, worker boots, and flying goggles. American and Asian Steampunks sometimes incorporate pirate shirts or petticoats borrowed from fantasy or Ren-Fair LARP, and elements of Japanese street style such as Gothic Lolita inspired short skirts, traditional silk kimonos, or parasols.

Classic preppy
During the early 2010s, American preppy guys moved away from the hip-hop influenced fashions of the 2000s and begun to dress in a more classic 1950s Ivy League style with sweaters, Sperry Top-Sider boat shoes, Aran sweaters, cardigans, Oxford shirts, Cricket pullovers, wingtips, stripy polo shirts with layered shirts underneath in cooler weather, hats like the fedora, khaki or pastel colored Vineyard Vines, Nantucket Reds, white or bright pastel color socks worn with sneakers and Sperry Top-Sider boat shoes, white casual sneakers especially from Vans and Sperrys brands, colored jeans, white Nike Elite crew socks, baseball jackets, and khaki shorts. From the mid-2010s on, khaki shorts with shorter 7, 6, and 5 inch inseams, jogger pants, and tapered chinos became popular for guys.

From 2012 onwards, seersucker blazers and pants made a comeback among young American men due to a resurgence of interest in classic preppy clothing and the 1920s fashion showcased in The Great Gatsby. Although pale blue and dark blue stripes remained the most popular choice, alternative colors included green, red and brown. The traditional two button blazer was updated with a slimmer cut and Edwardian inspired lapel piping, and double breasted jackets became available during the mid-2010s. Outside of the US, the Australian Olympic team received green and white candy stripe blazers for the 2016 Olympics and Toms shoes rather than the traditional dark green jackets with gold trim.

Throughout the 2010s, Preppy girls wore flip flops, ballet flats, Keds worn in ads by Mischa Barton, Ariana Grande and Taylor Swift, Sperry Top-Sider boat shoes, white casual Sperry sneakers, flat ankle boots with tights or crew or knee socks slouched down over tights, leggings, jeggings or skinny jeans, layered shirts and tees, cold shoulder tops, capri pants, ankle length pants, colored jeans, opaque or footless tights, tweed cloth or plaid skirts, skater dresses, skater skirts, baby doll dresses, cotton shorts in pastel colors, romper dress or romper with shorts, Uggs, Hunter boots brand rain boots, leg warmers, jogger pants, white or pastel colored skinny jeans, high waisted jeans, "mom" jeans worn with shirt or sweater tucked in and a belt, stacked waist denim, shortalls, railroad stripe blouses, knee socks, flat knee high riding boots with knee socks visible at top, flat ankle boots with visible slouched knee socks, jeggings, capri or ankle length leggings worn with shorts, dresses and skirts, oversized sweaters, bike shorts with or without lace trim worn with long shirts or under shorter skirts or dresses, 3/4 length sleeved shirts, tees and polos layered with a long sleeved shirt in cooler weather, Nike Tempo shorts, Nike Elite crew socks, and crew neck sweatshirts bearing the name and crest of the school or college. The British equivalent of preppies, known as Sloane rangers, dressed similarly, by combining traditional British upper class fashions such as tweed cloth sportcoats, white pants, jodhpurs, barbour jackets, practical knitwear, Chanel clothing, or strings of pearls with androgynous and revealing tailoring inspired by reality TV stars and supermodels like Cara Delevingne, including PVC skirts, lace blouses, designer brand sneakers, or cropped blue and white cardigans that exposed the stomach.

Skater and sneakerhead fashion
In the Americas, Britain, Australia, Ethiopia and the Philippines, many skaters wore designer streetwear such as joggers, hoodies, backwards baseball caps, and tracksuits in addition to the typical plaid shirts, ripped jeans and trucker hats. Common brands from 2012 to 2015 included Diamond Supply Co., Hollister, The Hundreds, OBEY bar logo T-shirts and snapback hats, Vans, Converse All Stars, cannabis, camouflage or foliage print shirts, Levi's jeans, Nike, LRG, DGK, Adidas Skateboarding and Originals apparel and shoes, and T-shirts featuring the Santa Cruz Skateboards screaming hand, eyeball, "cartoon grotesque" faces, Black Madonna, or Slasher cartoon character.

In the Americas, Malaysia, India, and China, an offshoot of the skater subculture, known as "sneakerheads", dress similarly. Common mid-2010s sneakerhead apparel includes Nike Air Jordans, Air Yeezys, Converse Moderns, Nike SBs, DC Spartans, Supra Sky-Tops, Vans, designer sportswear, True Religion slim fit jeans, backwards baseball caps, red high-tops with fluorescent or reflective white stars, Skullcandy headphones, leggings, slouched crew socks, and Keds (for girls), Aviator sunglasses, waffle plaid shirts, throwback basketball singlets, tracksuits, Nike Elite socks, cosmic print T-shirts, hoodies, and Nixon watches. , the most desirable colors for sneakers and apparel were black, red and white due to their longstanding association with late 1980s new wave music, the Michael Jordan era of basketball, and old school hip-hop.

Scene kids and seapunks

From 2010 to 2012, the androgynous scene subculture (also known regionally as "Shamate" and "Coloridos") remained common in the West Coast United States, Europe, Australasia, parts of Asia, and South America, especially in the Brazilian city of Fortaleza. The style was influenced by hip-hop, emo, Japanese street style, and indie pop fashion, especially skinny jeans, trucker hats, Nike shoes, mismatched neon green, fluorescent yellow, bright blue or hot pink socks worn with sneakers, Vans, Levi's 501 jeans, Dickies shorts, pocket watches, flannel shirts, thin ties, Nike Elite crew socks guys and girls, Chucks, Keds, vintage tees sometimes featuring pop art designs, plain tees with contrasting edging, and Vans. Shirts and hoodies with messages such as "cool story bro" or the logos of music like Asking Alexandria, Blood on the Dance Floor and Bring Me the Horizon became popular among scene kids. By 2012, many scene kids had abandoned the cartoon print hoodies, skinny jeans and studded belts in favor of a more hardcore/skate punk look with short hair, A-shirts, plain hoodies, combat boots, Vans, skinny jeans, and stretched earlobe piercings.

Seapunk, a fusion of scene, electronic dance music and hipster culture, began as an online internet meme before becoming a niche street fashion in Germany, Brazil and America. This movement influenced several mainstream pop and hip-hop artists during the mid-2010s, most notably Azealia Banks, Frank Ocean, and Rihanna. Seapunks often combined brightly dyed androgynous hairstyles with nautical themes such as mermaids or dolphins, plastic Ray Ban wayfarers, undercut hairstyles, merman hair and beards dyed blue, shell jewelry, feathers, tartan overshirts associated with the surfer subculture, 1990s inspired yin-yang T-shirts, baseball caps, tie dye, transparent plastic jackets, much green, light blue, turquoise, cyan or aquamarine clothing, smiley motifs, and red and blue 3-Dimensional images.

Hip-hop

Hip hop fans wear tactical pants, Nike sneakers and apparel, Air Jordans, Ralph Lauren Polo Boots, strapback caps, Obey and Diamond Supply Co. T-shirts, Mitchell & Ness retro snapbacks, True Religion jeans, and goggle jackets. Retro retro 1990s fashions like snapbacks, skinny acid-wash jeans, bucket hats, Retro curved peak mid-late 1990s inspired strapback caps (commonly known as "Dad Hats"), baseball jackets, nylon tracksuits, varsity jackets, Vans, Chuck Taylors, rain boots, retro Nikes, Shell tube socks, leather jackets, Levis, Adidas and Nike apparel, gold chains, Ray Ban sunglasses, Air Jordans, and oversized sweaters, and colors such as red, green, and yellow, made a comeback in the African American community due to the influence of drum and bass, rave music, and indie pop-inspired rappers. Independent brands have risen to popularity, as well as floral print items and tie-dye items. Timberlands are particularly popular in New York as a fashionable and durable shoe. By the 2010s, the boots' popularity is mainstream, and a staple in the fall and winter months. Controversially, high fashion magazines including Vogue and Elle have credited models rather than rappers with making Timberlands fashionable.

Fashion designers such as Riccardo Tisci and Rick Owens begin to gain a new popularity within hip hop, popularized by rappers such as Kanye West and A$AP Rocky. Such designers inspire a "darker" aesthetic involving monochromatic colour schemes (usually black or grey), extra-long shirts usually sporting oversized neck openings and asymmetrical hems, skinny jeans that are worn with long inseams and an aggressive taper to cause bunching up or "stacks" near the ankle (a style heavily popularized and sported by Kanye) and high-top sneakers. Black boots, leather jackets, denim vests, bombers, monochrome sports jerseys, waxed jeans, black varsity jackets, tapered sweatpants, drop-crotch trousers, layering shorts over leggings and occasionally floral print are all popular trends within this style as well. Other notable rappers that sport this look include Kendrick Lamar, Danny Brown, and Pusha T.

In the mid-2010s, dashikis became trendy in hip hop and afro-punk fashion, shown on celebrities like Beyoncé, Rihanna, Schoolboy Q, Zendaya Coleman, and Chris Brown.

Skater culture is also heavily prominent in hip hop fashion, largely attributed to alternative rapper Tyler the Creator and his group OFWGKTA. Models of shoes from Vans – such as the authentics, slip-ons, sk8-his, era, and "old skool" – were popularized in the hip hop community by him and Kanye West. Brands such as Supreme, Obey, merchandise from Odd Future, Tyler, the Creator's Golf Wang clothing line, HUF, and the apparel of skate magazine Thrasher are popular in hip hop and street style.

With the rise of alternative hip-hop subcultures, such as Cloud Rap and Emo Rap in the late 2010s, "sad boy" culture became prominent. It typically consists of teen guys, wearing bucket hats, skinny jeans and black and white clothes with colorful computer aesthetics, Japanese lettering, or sad faces. Many features of this fashion come from the emo subculture of the previous decade.

Cholo and chicano
In Mexico and the Southwestern US during the early 2010s, many members of the cholo, chicano and lowrider subcultures combine hip-hop fashion with Western shirts, traditional charro jackets, Stetson hats, skinny jeans, and Cowboy boots with elongated toes. These 3 ft long "Mexican pointy boots," associated with Tribal-guarachero music are an extreme version of the '60s-inspired Winklepickers popular in mid-2000s Britain.

By 2015, many young chicanos on the American West Coast had abandoned the garish Western inspired clubwear in favor of a more authentic 1950s inspired look. Pachuco style Zoot suits, fedoras and panama hats made a comeback, together with more typical casual rockabilly fashions for everyday wear such as slim jeans, black leather jackets, bowling shirts, brightly colored blouses and flouncy skirts for girls, polka dot dresses with petticoats, and flowers worn in the hair.

K-pop
Due to the spread of the Korean Wave worldwide, millions of Asian and Asian-American youths have become consumers of K-Pop. These are the people who love listening to South Korean music and follow the style of artists and pop groups like Big Bang, Wonder Girls, Girls' Generation, or Gangnam Style singer, Psy. Since the Korean girl and boy bands wore extravagant clothing, some of the hardcore fans in China, Korea, America and South-east Asian countries like the Philippines tried to copy their idols and started wearing K-Pop style hairstyles and clothing. These included skull, floral or honeycomb prints, monochromatic shirts, silk jackets featuring stylized Asian art prints or pop art, leather skirts, black and neon printed leggings, retro joggers, short shorts, black and gold jewelry, brightly colored tuxedo jackets, tracksuits, basketball shirts, leather caps, and sequined or glitter jackets.

Jejemon

During the early part of the 2010s, a new youth subculture called Jejemon arose in the Philippines, sparking a brief moral panic among some older conservatives and other youths. The Philippine Daily Inquirer describes Jejemons as a "new breed of hipster who have developed not only their own language and written text but also their own subculture and fashion. These predominantly working class youths are associated with wearing trucker hats and use their own language through texting and via social media such as Facebook. They are often criticized by others for not using the words properly; even the Department of Education discouraged use of the Jejemon language. Apart from the language, the Jejemons were also criticized for their fashion and manners. From early 2013 onwards, with the rise of smartphones which began to overtake feature phones in terms of sales in the country, the phenomenon seems to have made a gradual decline in mainstream popularity. For the remaining years of the decade, it would drop its text messaging-centered aspect in social media and now refers to the rap-centered subculture who usually wear counterfeit hip-hop clothing.

E-Kids and VSCO Kids

From 2018 to 2020s, internet memes influenced fashion and subcultures began to emerge among teenagers and youth in the US, popularized among social media apps such as VSCO. and TikTok. The fashion choices for VSCO girls and E-Girls can be described as relaxed and easygoing, and include black oversized T-shirts in imitation of Jenna Marbles, other oversize t-shirts, sweatshirts, or sweaters, Nike athletic shorts, leggings, bike shorts with overized tops or under shorter dresses, mom jeans worn with a belt and shirt or sweater tucked in, cuffed jean shorts, jean skirts, stacked waist denim, shortalls, overalls, jogger pants, romper dress or romper shorts, scrunchies, tights, pink blush with fake freckles, retro sneakers from the 1990s such as Vans or low-top Converse, ballet flats, colorful socks, Nike socks, metal water bottles, chains, fishnet tops, hoodies, Crocs decorated with pins, Birkenstocks, striped sweaters, and beach-related fashion such as Daisy Dukes or shell jewelry. Environmental concerns (in particular for sea turtle conservation) are common. E-Kids' fashion is described as being inspired by skater culture, 1990s fashion, anime, hip-hop, kpop, emo rap and trap metal.

2010s beauty trends

Hairstyles

Women

Women's hairstyles in the early 2010s had been fairly individualistic, although most British, Irish, Australian, Russian, Korean, and continental European women kept the simplistic, straight, long and natural colored hairstyles of the mid-2000s. Many women also used hair extensions to make their hair look much longer and fuller. In America and Israel, volumized curly hair, perms and crimped hair were briefly fashionable from 2010 to 2012, especially in New York City.

By the mid-2010s, straight and wavy hairstyles were dominant globally, especially the blonde dyed beach waves. Traditional and intricate styles such as a bun, chignon, French twist, updo, crown braid, French braid, and Dutch braid inspired by the Hunger Games' Katniss Everdeen, were also popular among young women and girls from 2012 to 2016. By 2013 it had become increasingly fashionable for European, Asian and American women to cut their hair into shorter styles, such as the pixie cut, crop, bob cut or the undercut. Solid colored hair was generally considered the most fashionable in the early years of the decade, but from 2011 to 2014 it became increasingly common for Western women to dye their hair in an ombré style, usually long and preferably parted in the middle, as the side part became associated with the previous decade aesthetics. Wavy hair began to decline in popularity from 2017 onwards, but bone straight hair remained common in Britain and Europe. A messy bun, often worn on the top of the head, has been popular in the late 2010s.

At the beginning of the decade, Rihanna started a trend of cherry red hairstyles for black women in America. From 2012 to 2018, many African-American, Black Canadian, and Afro-Caribbean British women favored natural, Afro-textured hair and dreadlocks, opting for natural products to style their hair. Zoë Kravitz and Beyoncé helped re-popularize braided hairstyles including box braids and Fulani braids, which the media nicknamed "Lemonade braids", respectively.

During the mid-2010s, some curly haired American women also choose to wear weaves and wigs in imitation of celebrities like Lady Gaga or Rihanna, in order to avoid the damage of relaxers previously popular in the early 2000s. Cornrows which media outlets misnamed "boxer braids" due to their use by female MMA fighters and Hilary Swank's character in Million Dollar Baby, became popular among white American women from 2016 onwards, despite perceived cultural appropriation from black American women.

Various variations of bangs styles remained popular throughout the decade.

Men

In the early 2010s, men's 1930s, 1940s, and 1950s haircuts underwent a revival, with many British professionals aged 18–50 wearing businessman's haircuts with side partings, quiffs or slicked back hair. The undercut has been a particularly ubiquitous trend since the early part of the decade, seeing popularity across different social groups in both Western and Asian cultures. These gradually replaced the longer surfer hair and Harry Styles haircuts popular among teenagers and young men since 2010. In the Americas and the Middle East, the military haircut and buzzcut are relatively popular among balding men, or the side parted hair with some volume on the top, inspired by footballer Cristiano Ronaldo.

For African-American and black men in general, mohawk variants of the Afro, The 360 Waves, jheri curl and The Taper were popular in the early to mid 2010s, as are shaved patterns or "steps" into variants of the buzzcut. The High Top Fade, often with a bleached blonde streak inspired by Wiz Khalifa, came back into style among African American youth on the West Coast. Starting from late 2014, variants of tapered Dreadlocks and Hair twists hair styles became widely popular amongst many black teens and young men.

From 2014 some teens and young men wore their hair in a type of topknot or "man bun" reminiscent of the ancient Chinese and the samurai hairstyles. This trend was popularised by British and American celebrities including actors Orlando Bloom and Jared Leto as well as footballer Gareth Bale.

By 2017, the undercut hairstyle and buzzcut began to decline in the United States, partly due to the unintended popularity of these haircuts among supporters of the alt-right, such as white supremacist Richard Spencer. British hipsters frequently left their undercut unstyled in imitation of 1990s Britpop and early Beatles haircuts. However, undercut and buzzcut hair styles continued to predominate in Brazil, Morocco, Egypt, Uruguay, Paraguay, and Algeria in the late 2010s and early 2020s.

Youth

For preteen and teenaged girls, and young women in higher education, the bangs and thin headband combination remained popular in the US and Europe for much of the decade. Dutch braids, twin French braids, side ponytails, and a single chunky side braid were popular styles for those with longer hair throughout the mid and late 2010s. Side parting was popular in America, and in 2019 ponytails with scrunchies were increasingly popular not only for sport and exercise, but also everyday especially with high ponytails, side ponytails and high buns. In the late 2010s middle veins were very popular especially in Britain, Ireland and the rest of Europe. The chin length bob cut, long hair with choppy side bangs, and straight middle parted longer hair were also popular styles in the US, Europe, New Zealand and Australia.

In the UK, Middle East, and Australia during the early 2010s, a type of short mullet haircut with buzzed sides and bleached blond streaks became popular among sporty male young people, teenage Irish travellers, and urban youths of Iranian and Lebanese descent inspired by The Combination crime film. By 2013, a long undercut or mohawk-like haircut, in which only one side of the head is buzzed, became popular among circles of ravers, hipster girls, metalcore, and dubstep fans in the US, inspired by Skrillex and various female pop stars such as Ellie Goulding, Tess Aquarium, Miley Cyrus, or Rihanna. The emo style fringes also went out of fashion around the same time.
By 2015 and 2016, the balayage – a softer version off the ombré – gained popularity, as well as having a blunt haircut instead of layered hair. The lob (long bob cut) was considered a unique alternative to the long hair worn by most adolescent girls and young women in Europe.

For adolescent boys and young men, in the United States, Canada, Australasia, the UK and South Korea, the layered short hair style, the buzzed short hairstyle which is blended from the sides to the top, and the Blowout (hairstyle) became popular during the mid-2010s due to continued interest in 1980s and 1990s fashion. Additionally the side swept bangs, the quiff, and the layered longer hair of the late 2000s remain fashionable among more affluent American young men.

Makeup and cosmetics

In Britain, the smoky eye look of the late 2000s carried on as a trend in many parts of the country. In other areas, this went out of fashion during the early and mid 2010s as women sought to imitate the fake tan and thick "Scouse brow" popularized by Kate Middleton, Cara Delevingne and the cast of The Only Way is Essex and Desperate Scousewives. Fake tan became the norm look for young teens especially in Ireland. Multiple layers of tan would be worn to give an orange effect.

In the West, contouring (a technique using different shades of makeup to create highlighted angles, creating an illusion of higher cheekbones, slim nose and a sharper jawline) began to emerge. Several other more short-lived trends were born out of this, such as strobing in 2015 and 2016 which consisted of using glowy highlighters to accentuate the high points of the face. The early decade's "erased-mouth" and pale pink lipsticks were replaced by matte red by 2012–13, as sported by celebrities such as Taylor Swift and Rihanna. By 2015–16, mauve and brown shades of lipstick make a comeback from the 1990s, promoted by Kylie Jenner. Dark mascara, false eyelashes, dyed hair and cheek blush were popularised by Instagram social media influencers in the UK, American and Dubai such as Olivia Buckland and Huda Kattan.

Unlike in previous decades, excessive use of fake-tans has become less popular in the United States, possibly due to tanning beds being linked to cancer.

In late 2016, minimalist, makeup looks and "dewy" natural skin saw a surge of popularity among young people, especially in New York City.

In the late 2010s, a softer, goth inspired, style of makeup came into fashion, this was called egirl makeup. This style of makeup included small, black symbols drawn under the eyes (predominantly hearts) and winged eyeliner, both of these trends drew attention to the eyes. Another part of egirl makeup was large amounts of blush all over the cheeks and nose, finished off by highlighter on the nose.

Body modifications

Continuing on from the 1990s and 2000s, body modifications remained popular among many teenagers and blue collar men and women in the US, Britain, Japan, Israel, Singapore, New Zealand and Australia, especially traditional Japanese tattoos. Old school tattoos were popularised by female celebrities like Kat Von D imitating the pinup girls of the 1950s, and by men like footballer David Beckham, pop star Harry Styles or Justin Bieber aspiring for the "tough guy" look. From 2013 to 2019, the earrings, metallic bone tattoos, portraits of animals, relatives or celebrities, and tongue piercings that had gained mainstream acceptance in the late 2000s were joined by more extreme modifications such as stretched piercings, facial tattoos popularized by rappers like 6ix9ine and Post Malone,  flesh tunnels, lip piercings, and nose piercings, particularly the nose septum piercing.

Facial hair
In many Western countries, the United States, Iraq, and Eastern Europe, the growing of a full beard became a popular trend amongst young men from 2011 to 2016, with some suggesting this was due to the influence of the hipster subculture, the lumbersexual ideal, and the Movember campaign. An increase in facial hair transplants was reported in the United Kingdom within the first three years of the decade, and the trend approached what researchers predicted would be a 'peak' level of desirability. Beards remained common for much of the mid to late-2010s, but by the end of 2016; many men favoured shorter, neatly-groomed styles.

In the UK, facial hair is even more prevalent among younger British men. More than six in ten (61%) 18–39 year olds in March 2017 said they had some form of facial hair, compared to 43% back in 2011.

Exhibitions

2010 
 "American Woman: Fashioning a National Identity" May 5 until August 15 at the Costume Institute at Metropolitan Museum of Art in New York City (Drawn form the costume collection of the Brooklyn Museum which was transferred to the Metropolitan Museum in 2008).

2011 
 "Daphne Guinness" curated by Daphne Guinness and Valerie Steele September 16 until January 7, 2012, at the Museum at FIT in New York City.
 "Alexander McQueen: Savage beauty" May 4 until August 7 at the Costume Institute at the Metropolitan Museum of Art in New York City.
 "Vivienne Westwood, 1980–89" March 8 until April 2 at the Museum at FIT in New York City.

2012 
 "Fashion and Technology" December 4 until May 8, 2013, at the Museum at FIT in New York City.
 "Schiaperelli and Prada: Impossible Conversations" May 10 until August 19 at the Costume Institute at the Metropolitan Museum of Art in New York City.

2013 
 "A Queer History of Fashion: From the Closet to the Catwalk" September 13 until January 4, 2014, at the Museum at FIT in New York City.
 "Punk: Chaos to Couture" May 9 until August 14 at the Costume Institute at the Metropolitan Museum of Art in New York City.

2014 
 "Chares James: Beyond Fashion" May 8 until August 10 at the Costume Institute at the metropolitan Museum of Art in New York City.

2015 
 "China: Through the Looking Glass" May 7 through September 7 at the Costume Institute at the Metropolitan Museum of Art in New York City.

2016 
 "Manus x Machina: Fashion In An Age Of Technology" May 5 until September 5 at the Costume Institute at the Metropolitan Museum of Art in New York City.

2017 
 "Rei Kawakubo/Comme des Garçons: Art of the In-Between" May 4 until September 4 at the Anna Wintour Costume Center at the Metropolitan Museum of Art in New York City.

2018 
"Heavenly Bodies: Fashion and the Catholic Imagination" May 10 until October 8 at the Anna Winter Costume Center at the Metropolitan Museum of Art in New York City.
"Norell: Dean of American Fashion" February 9 until April 14 at the Museum of at FIT in New York City, New York.

2019 
 "Thierry Mugler: Couturissime" March 2 until 8 at the Montréal Museum of Fine Arts in Montreal, Quebec, Canada. then traveled to the Musée des Arts Décoratifs, Paris from September 30. 2021 to April 24, 2022.
 "Camp: Notes on Fashion" May 9 until September 8 at the Anna Wintour Costume Center at the Metropolitan Museum of Art in New York City.
 "Pierre Cardin: Future Fashion" July 20 until January 5, 2020, at the Brooklyn Museum.
 "Christian Dior: Designer of Dreams" February 2 until September 1 at the Victoria and Albert Museum in London, United Kingdom.
 "Minimalism/Maximalism" May 28 until November 16 at the Museum at the FIT in New York City, New York.
 "Paris: Capital of Fashion" September 6 until January 4, 2020, at the Museum at FIT in New York City, New York.
 "The World of Anna Sui" September 12 until February 23, 2020, at the Museum of Art and Design in New York City.
 "In Pursuit of Fashion: The Sandy Schreier Collection" November 27 until May 17, 2020, at the Anna Winter Costume Center at the Metropolitan Museum of Art in New York City.

Gallery

See also

2000s in fashion
2010s
2020s in fashion
Anti-fashion
Fashion and clothing in the Philippines
Fashion design
Fashion in India
History of Western fashion
Indie culture
Skate culture
Vintage clothing

References

Further reading
Mexico's hottest fashion craze: 'Narco Polo' jerseys

 
2010s decade overviews